Yeo Seo-jeong (Hangul: 여서정; born 20 February 2002) is a South Korean artistic gymnast. She is the 2020 Olympic bronze medalist, the 2018 Asian Games champion, and 2022 Asian champion on vault. She is the first South Korean female gymnast to win an Olympic medal.

Early life 
Yeo Seo-jeong was born on 20 February 2002 in Yongin-si. Both of Yeo's parents are retired gymnasts. Her mother won a team bronze medal in the 1994 Asian Games, and her father, Yeo Hong-chul, was the 1996 Olympic silver medalist on vault. She said in 2018 that she enjoys vault because of her father.

Career

2018 
Yeo won the all-around at the South Korean National Championships in addition to winning vault and floor. She also won the silver medal on uneven bars. Then, she made her senior international debut at the Guimaraes Challenge Cup and won the gold medal on vault. She was then selected to compete at the 2018 Asian Games alongside Ham Mi-ju, Kim Ju-ry, Lee Eun-ju, and Yun Na-rae. The team finished in fourth place. Individually, Yeo won the gold medal on vault, and she placed ninth in the all-around, eighth on beam, and seventh on floor. She then competed at the World Championships where she placed fifth on vault. Her final meet of the season was the Voronin Cup where she won vault gold, all-around silver, and floor exercise bronze, and she placed eighth on bars and beam.

2019 
Yeo won the gold medal on vault at the Melbourne World Cup. This was the first time that a Korean female gymnast won a gold medal in the FIG World Cup series. At the 2019 Korea Cup, Yeo became the first woman to land the handspring double twist vault. She said of the new vault, "I was afraid, but once I started focusing on the competition, my fear disappeared. I am so happy that I was able to execute that. I wanted to land the new vault regardless of my final rankings today, and everything went my way." The vault was then named after her and added to the Code of Points. At the World Championships in Stuttgart, Yeo qualified to the vault final in fifth place with a score of 14.766. However, she finished last in the final after a fall and going out of bounds when attempting the handspring double twist vault. Because she qualified for the vault event final, Yeo qualified as an individual for the 2020 Olympic Games. After the World Championships, she competed at the Swiss Cup alongside Lee Jun-ho, and they finished seventh in the team competition.

2021 
At the 2020 Olympic Games, Yeo competed in the vault final and performed her eponymous vault, which had the highest difficulty value in the final. She finished with an average score of 14.733 and won the bronze medal behind Brazilian Rebeca Andrade and American MyKayla Skinner. This made her the first South Korean female gymnast to win an Olympic medal.

2022 
Yeo competed at the 2022 Asian Championships in June.  While there she helped South Korea finish second as a team behind China.  Individually she won gold on vault and placed fifth in the all-around and on floor exercise.

Eponymous skills
Yeo has one eponymous skill listed in the Code of Points.

Competitive history

References

External links 
 

Living people
2002 births
South Korean female artistic gymnasts
Asian Games medalists in gymnastics
Gymnasts at the 2018 Asian Games
Asian Games gold medalists for South Korea
Hamyang Yeo clan
People from Yongin
Medalists at the 2018 Asian Games
Originators of elements in artistic gymnastics
Gymnasts at the 2020 Summer Olympics
Olympic gymnasts of South Korea
Medalists at the 2020 Summer Olympics
Olympic bronze medalists for South Korea
Olympic medalists in gymnastics
Sportspeople from Gyeonggi Province
21st-century South Korean women